Chanticleer may refer to:

Fiction 
Chanticleer, a rooster appearing in fables about Reynard the Fox
A character in The Nun's Priest's Tale, a version of Chanticleer and the Fox told in Chaucer's Canterbury Tales 
The protagonist of the novel The Book of the Dun Cow, based on the cock from The Nun's Priest's Tale
Chanticleer, the name of a rooster in the poem The First Snow-fall, by American poet James Russell Lowell (1819-1891)
Chanticleer, a character in the 1991 movie Rock-a-Doodle, voiced by Glen Campbell
Chanticleer, the surname of the main family in Hope Mirrlees' 1926 novel Lud-in-the-Mist
Chanticleer, the name of a hen in Disney's 2015 adaptation of Cinderella
Chanticleer, a rooster mentioned twice in Oscar Wilde's short story The Canterville Ghost

Arts 
 Chanticleer (ensemble), a male vocal ensemble
 Chanticleer (magazine), a short-lived (1952–1954) literary magazine edited by the poets Patrick Galvin and Gordon Wharton
 Chanticleer, a race of angelic humanoids in the game Project Nomad
 The Chanticleer, a student-run magazine at Averett University in Danville, VA
 The Chanticleer (yearbook), Duke University's undergraduate yearbook
 Chanticleer, a long-running newspaper column focused on business, published in the Australian Financial Review.

Sports 
 "The Chanticleers", the mascots of:
 Rutgers University, before changing to the Scarlet Knights
 Coastal Carolina University, Conway, South Carolina, United States
 Ord High School, Ord, Nebraska, United States
 The French national rugby league team (as Les Chanticleers)

Places 
 Chanticleer, Arkansas, an unincorporated community in Chicot County, Arkansas, United States
 Chanticleer Garden, a botanical garden located in Wayne, Pennsylvania, United States
 Chanticleer Island, an island lying off the northwest end of Hoseason Island in the Palmer Archipelago
 Chanticleer Point, a geographical landmark on the Oregon side of the Columbia River Gorge

Ships 
, more than one ship of the British Royal Navy
, more than one United States Navy ship
 Chanticleer-class submarine rescue vessel

See also
Chantecler (disambiguation)